In computing, the WINGs Display Manager (WDM) is a display manager for the X window system, mainly used for graphically logging in, on a Unix-based system.
WINGs is a modification of XDM, XFree86's original display manager.

It uses a Window Maker-style interface to present a graphical login screen. It uses the WINGs widget toolkit.

See also 
Other display managers

External links 

WDM homepage
GitHub repository

X display managers